Chee may refer to:

People
 Chee (given name), a unisex given name
 Chee (surname), a surname

Other uses
 22158 Chee, a main-belt asteroid
 Chée, a river in northeastern France
 Chee, a race of androids in the Animorphs novel series

See also
 Chi (disambiguation)
 Qi (disambiguation)
 Chee-Chee (disambiguation)